

Harriet Tubman's birthplace is in Dorchester County, Maryland. Araminta Ross, the daughter of Benjamin (Ben) and Harriet (Rit) Greene Ross, was born into slavery in 1822
 in her father's cabin. It was located on the farm of Anthony Thompson at Peter's Neck, at the end of Harrisville Road, which is now part of the Blackwater National Wildlife Refuge.

After a few years, she lived on the Brodess farm with her mother and siblings. In the early 1840s, her father was emancipated and received 10 acres of land following Anthony Johnson's death. She was married in 1844 to John Tubman, at the same time, she changed her given name, becoming Harriet Tubman. Realizing she was to be sold following her enslaver's death, Tubman escaped in 1849, when she was 27 years of age. A conductor on the Underground Railroad, she made 13 return trips over 10 years to lead her parents, siblings, and friends to freedom.

In March 2021, archaeologists excavated what they determined to be the site of Ben Ross's cabin. They found artifacts from the 1800s, including broken dish ware, glass, a button, and nails. In April 2021, it was said that the site was to be added to the Harriet Tubman Underground Railroad Scenic Byway. It is a scenic drive with more than 30 stops over 125 miles.

See also
 List of Underground Railroad sites

Notes

References

Further reading

External links
 Clues of Harriet Tubman's birthplace found in Dorchester County, WBAL-TV 11 Baltimore on YouTube

Harriet Tubman
Dorchester County, Maryland
Birthplaces of individual people
African-American history of Maryland